Leo and Loree is a 1980 American romantic comedy film directed by Jerry Paris, starring Donny Most and Linda Purl. It was the first theatrical film from Ron Howard's production company.

Plot
Leo and Loree are a young couple and aspiring actors trying to succeed in show business. Leo's career is hampered by his attitude, and Loree's career is helped by her mother – an Oscar-winning actress – who has opened doors for her. In spite of their feelings for each other, the ups and downs of the couple's professional lives affect their relationship.

Cast  
 Donny Most as Leo
 Linda Purl as Loree
 David Huffman as Dennis
 Jerry Paris as Tony
 Shannon Farnon as Christina Harper
 Allan Rich as Jarvis
 Susan Lawrence as Cindy

Production
Ron Howard started the project in 1975 during spare time on weekends while filming Happy Days and started shooting scenes on 16 mm film. James Ritz, a writer for Happy Days, started a script but the project was put on hold until Howard took it to ABC as a potential television movie which led to Ritz expanding the rough script. After ABC later decided not to progress the project further, Howard set the project up at Major H Productions, which he had created in 1977 with his father Rance and brother Clint, funding most of the low budget himself. The film was their first theatrical release with United Artists acquiring domestic distribution rights in 1979.

The director, Jerry Paris, had filmed every episode of Happy Days at the time. The star, Donny Most, was also a regular on Happy Days, as Ralph Malph.

The film was shot in Southern California, including Malibu, Beverly Hills and Venice, Los Angeles.

References

External links

1980 films
1980 romantic comedy films
American romantic comedy films
Fictional couples
Films about actors
Films directed by Jerry Paris
United Artists films
1980s English-language films
1980s American films